Sheldry Nazareth Sáez Bustavino (born 15 January 1992 in Chitré, Herrera) is a Panamanian dancer, model, TV Host and beauty pageant titleholder who won Miss Panamá 2011. she represented Panama at Miss Universe 2011 and made Top 10.

Modelling career
The start of her modeling career took place when she won the "Wilhelmina Model Search" contest in 2007. It gave Saez the chance to work for Wilhelmina Panama Talents, her official modeling agency as of today.

Miss Panamá 2011

At the end of the Miss Panamá 2011 she also received awards including Best Fantasy Costume, Miss Photogenic, and "Misses Council," awarded by the panel of judges that included former beauty queens and participants of Miss Panama.

Sáez is 5 ft 8 in (1.73 m) tall, and competed in the national beauty pageant Miss Panamá 2011, obtained the title of Miss Panamá Universo. She represented the province of Herrera.

Miss Universe 2011
She represented Panama in the 60th Miss Universe 2011 which was held in the Credicard Hall, São Paulo, Brazil on September 12, 2011. She place in the top 10 and won the Best National Costume Award.

See also
 Irene Núñez
 Miss Panamá 2011

References

External links
Panamá 2011 official website
Miss Panamá
Miss Panamá blogspot

1992 births
Living people
Miss Universe 2011 contestants
Panamanian beauty pageant winners
Señorita Panamá
Panamanian female models
People from Chitré